Flag Act, Flag Acts, Flags Act may refer to:

 Flag Act (Philippines), an act of the Philippine Commission that outlawed the display of Katipunan flags
 Flag Act of 1865, an act of the Confederate Congress that defined the Third Confederate flag
 Flag Acts, the three laws that define the design of the flag of the United States
 Flags Act 1953, an act of the Parliament of Australia which defines the official Flag of Australia

See also
 Flag Protection Act
 Flag Protection Act of 2005